Simona Aebersold (born 13 April 1998) is a Swiss orienteering competitor. She is the daughter of Christian Aebersold, who won the World Orienteering Championships 3 times.

Career
Aebersold dominated the Junior World Championships between 2015 and 2018, achieving her first gold medal at the age of 17 in the Sprint distance. She won every Junior World sprint event for the next four years, as well as medalling in three relay events, with two silvers and one gold.

In 2017, Aebersold won all 3 individual golds and a further medal in the relay, matching the feat achieved the same year by Finnish runner Olli Ojanaho in the men's class.

At the start of 2018, Aebersold won her first medal at a senior level in the European Championships, despite still being a junior and eligible to compete at the Junior World Championships. She won the Bronze in the Middle behind Swedish world champion Tove Alexandersson and Marika Teini from Finland.

In 2019, at her first World Orienteering Championships appearance, Aebersold won the bronze medal in the long distance after Alexandersson and Lina Strand. She also won second place in the middle distance race, 5 seconds behind Alexandersson.

In 2021, Aebersold came second in the World Cup, the same position she attained in 2019. On the last race, a middle distance event in Cansiglio, Italy, she came second behind Alexandersson by only 23 seconds- a win would have guaranteed Aebersold the overall World Cup title, with her score only being 25 points behind Alexandersson at the end of the season.

Aebersold signed for Swedish club IFK Göteborg in 2022.

References

External links 
 

1998 births
Living people
Swiss orienteers
Female orienteers
Foot orienteers
Competitors at the 2022 World Games
World Games medalists in orienteering
World Games gold medalists
21st-century Swiss women
Junior World Orienteering Championships medalists